Nguyễn Phương Lan is a former wushu taolu athlete from Vietnam. She was among the first generation of renowned athletes from Vietnam, having achieved numerous victories in internal competition.

Career 
Nguyễn was a competitive swimmer in her youth, and later started practicing shaolinquan for a year in 1991. The following year, she was selected by the Hanoi Department of Physical Education to join the first wushu class in Vietnam despite being married and a factory worker.

Competitive career 
Nguyễn made her international debut at the 1993 Southeast Asian Games where she won a bronze medal in jianshu. Two years later, she competed in the 1995 World Wushu Championships and won a silver medal in jianshu and a bronze medal in daoshu. Wushu was later re-introduced in the 1997 Southeast Asian Games and Nguyễn won the gold medal in nanquan and a silver medal in qiangshu. Shortly after, she was a triple medalist at the 1997 World Wushu Championships, winning a silver medal in jianshu and two bronze medals in nanquan and qiangshu. Two years later, she was the first world champion in nangun and won a silver medal in nandao and bronze medal in nanquan at the 1999 World Wushu Championships. A year later at the 2000 Asian Wushu Championships, she won gold medals in nandao and nangun as well as a silver medal in nanquan and won the all-around championship for female nanquan. A year later at the 2001 Southeast Asian Games, Nguyễn won a gold medal in nandao and nangun combined and a bronze medal in nanquan. Her last competition was at the 2001 World Wushu Championships, where she won two silver medals in nanquan and nangun and a bronze medal in nandao.

Coaching career 
In 2003, Nguyễn became the coach of the Vietnam National Youth Wushu Team. In 2007, she became the national team coach.

Awards 

 Labor Order, 2nd class (2001)

References 

1971 births
Living people
Vietnamese wushu practitioners
Sportspeople from Hanoi
Southeast Asian Games gold medalists for Vietnam
Southeast Asian Games silver medalists for Vietnam
Southeast Asian Games bronze medalists for Vietnam
Wushu practitioners at the 1998 Asian Games